Lisa Czechowski (née Banta, born May 29, 1979, in New Jersey) is an American goalball player.

Her Paralympic debut won her a silver medal for discus at the 2000 Sydney Paralympic Games; she also competed in goalball at those games. In December 2001 she took part in the torch relay for the 2002 Winter Olympics in Salt Lake City.

Czechowski and teammate Asya Miller competed in their sixth Paralympics together at the 2020 Tokyo Paralympic Games. Together they have won four Paralympic medals, including gold at the 2008 Beijing Paralympic Games.

She was born with nystagmus and diagnosed with cone dystrophy while in middle school, both conditions affecting her vision. In high school, she tried various track and field events, eventually moving to shot put and discus. She first became involved with goalball in 1995.

She is the daughter of David and Barbara Banta, is married to Jacob Czechowski (USA women's coach) and has a son Jay Czechowski born July 2, 2014.

See also 
 United States women's national goalball team
 2012 Summer Paralympics roster
 2016 Summer Paralympics roster
 2020 Summer Paralympics roster

References

External links 
 
  (2012)
  (2000-2008)

1979 births
Living people
American female discus throwers
Female goalball players
Paralympic track and field athletes of the United States
Paralympic goalball players of the United States
Paralympic gold medalists for the United States
Paralympic silver medalists for the United States
Paralympic medalists in athletics (track and field)
Visually impaired discus throwers
Athletes (track and field) at the 2000 Summer Paralympics
Goalball players at the 2000 Summer Paralympics
Goalball players at the 2004 Summer Paralympics
Goalball players at the 2008 Summer Paralympics
Medalists at the 2000 Summer Paralympics
Medalists at the 2004 Summer Paralympics
Medalists at the 2008 Summer Paralympics
Medalists at the 2011 Parapan American Games
Medalists at the 2015 Parapan American Games
Medalists at the 2019 Parapan American Games
Goalball players at the 2020 Summer Paralympics
21st-century American women
Paralympic discus throwers